District Administration is an American monthly trade publication for education leaders in public K-12 school districts. Based out of Norwalk, Connecticut, and published by Professional Media Group LLC, which also publishes University Business magazine for higher education leaders, it is the only education magazine to reach every superintendent in the country, along with assistant superintendents, technology directors, school board presidents and federal funds administrators, among others.

With a circulation of nearly 75,000, the magazine covers current trends and pressing issues in the American education system along with coverage of emerging technologies and leadership issues for district-level administrators.

The online version of the magazine includes a blog forum where education experts debate controversial issues affecting school districts.

Its editor-in-chief is Odvard Egil Dyrli, emeritus professor of education at the University of Connecticut and a technology keynote speaker and workshop leader at national education conferences.

Notes

Monthly magazines published in the United States
Education magazines
Magazines with year of establishment missing
Magazines published in Connecticut